Brucella lupini is a non-rhizobial root-nodulating bacterium. It nodulates Lupinus albus, hence its name. Strain LUP21T (LMG 20667T) is the type strain.

References

Further reading

External links 

LPSN
Type strain of Ochrobactrum lupini at BacDive -  the Bacterial Diversity Metadatabase

Hyphomicrobiales
Bacteria described in 2006